A legal doctrine is a framework, set of rules, procedural steps, or test, often established through precedent in the common law, through which judgments can be determined in a given legal case. A doctrine comes about when a judge makes a ruling where a process is outlined and applied, and allows for it to be equally applied to like cases. When enough judges make use of the process, it may become established as the de facto method of deciding like situations.

Examples
Examples of legal doctrines include:

See also
 Constitutionalism
 Constitutional economics
 Concept
 Rule according to higher law
 Legal fiction
 Legal precedent
 Ex aequo et bono

References

External links

Pierre Schlag and Amy J. Griffin, "How to do Things with Legal Doctrine" (University of Chicago Press 2020)
 Emerson H. Tiller and Frank B. Cross, "What is Legal Doctrine?," Northwestern University Law Review, Vol. 100:1, 2006.